The Journal of Irrigation and Drainage Engineering is a monthly peer-reviewed scientific journal published by the American Society of Civil Engineers covering irrigation engineering as a specialty area in agricultural engineering, and drainage engineering as a specialty area in civil engineering.

History
The journal was established in 1956 as the Journal of the Irrigation and Drainage Division (1956-1982), obtaining its current name in 1983.

Abstracting and indexing
The journal is abstracted and indexed in Ei Compendex, ProQuest databases, Civil Engineering Database, Inspec, Scopus, and EBSCO databases.

References

External links

Engineering journals
American Society of Civil Engineers academic journals
Monthly journals
English-language journals
Publications established in 1956